The Local Bubble, or Local Cavity, is a relative cavity in the interstellar medium (ISM) of  the Orion Arm in the Milky Way. It contains the closest of celestial neighbours and among others, the Local Interstellar Cloud (which contains the Solar System), the neighbouring G-Cloud, the Ursa Major moving group (the closest stellar moving group) and the Hyades (the nearest open cluster). It is estimated to be at least 1000 light years in size, and is defined by its neutral-hydrogen density of about 0.05 atoms/cm3, or approximately one tenth of the average for the ISM in the Milky Way (0.5 atoms/cm3), and one sixth that of the Local Interstellar Cloud (0.3 atoms/cm3).

The exceptionally sparse gas of the Local Bubble is the result of supernovae that exploded within the past ten to twenty million years.  Geminga, a pulsar in the constellation Gemini, was once thought to be the  remnant of a single supernova that created the Local Bubble, but now multiple supernovae in subgroup B1 of the Pleiades moving group are thought to have been responsible, becoming a remnant supershell.

Description
The Solar System has been traveling through the region currently occupied by the Local Bubble for the last five to ten million years.  Its current location lies in the Local Interstellar Cloud (LIC), a minor region of denser material within the Bubble. The LIC formed where the Local Bubble and the Loop I Bubble met. The gas within the LIC has a density of approximately 0.3 atoms per cubic centimeter.

The Local Bubble is not spherical, but seems to be narrower in the galactic plane, becoming somewhat egg-shaped or elliptical, and may widen above and below the galactic plane, becoming shaped like an hourglass. It abuts other bubbles of less dense interstellar medium (ISM), including, in particular, the Loop I Bubble. The Loop I Bubble was cleared, heated and maintained by supernovae and stellar winds in the Scorpius–Centaurus association, some 500 light years from the Sun. The Loop I Bubble contains the star Antares (also known as α Sco, or Alpha Scorpii), as shown on the diagram above right. Several tunnels connect the cavities of the Local Bubble with the Loop I Bubble, called the "Lupus Tunnel". Other bubbles which are adjacent to the Local Bubble are the Loop II Bubble and the Loop III Bubble.
In 2019, researchers found interstellar iron in Antarctica which they relate to the Local Interstellar Cloud, which might be related to the formation of the Local Bubble.

Observation

Launched in February 2003 and active until April 2008, a small space observatory called Cosmic Hot Interstellar Plasma Spectrometer (CHIPS or CHIPSat) examined the hot gas within the Local Bubble. The Local Bubble was also the region of interest for the Extreme Ultraviolet Explorer mission (1992–2001), which examined hot EUV sources within the bubble. Sources beyond the edge of the bubble were identified but attenuated by the denser interstellar medium. In 2019, the first 3D map of the Local Bubble has been reported using the observations of diffuse interstellar bands.

Impact on star formation

In January 2022, a paper in the journal Nature found that observations and modelling had determined that the action of the expanding surface of the bubble had collected gas and debris and was responsible for the formation of all young, nearby stars.

These new stars are typically in molecular clouds like the Taurus molecular cloud and the open star cluster Pleiades.

Gallery

See also

 Gould Belt
 List of nearest stars and brown dwarfs
 List of nearby stellar associations and moving groups
 List of Milky Way streams
 Orion–Eridanus Superbubble
 Orion Arm
 Superbubble

References

Further reading

External links

 
Interstellar media